Abdol Hossein Hejazi (1904–1969) was an Iranian military officer who served as the commander of the Imperial Iranian Army's Ground Forces between 1958 and 1960.

Biography
Hejazi was born in 1904. He graduated from École Spéciale Militaire de Saint-Cyr in France. He was a major general. Following the proclamation of the martial law on 20 March 1951 after the approval of the nationalization of oil by the Senate he was appointed military governor. Hejazi was also made the chief of police on the same date replacing General Mohammad Faftari who had resigned from the post.

He served as the head of the military college until August 1952 when he was removed from the post. The reason for Hejazi's removal was his alliance with Fazlollah Zahedi who was a retired military officer and senator and a rival of Prime Minister Mohammad Mosaddegh. Another reason was his involvement in the alleged coup plot against Mosaddegh. On 13 October 1952 an arrest warrant was issued for Hejazi, Assadollah Rashidian, his brother and others. They were arrested, but were soon released.

Following the removal of Mohammad Mosaddegh Hejazi returned to the army and served as the commanding general of the 3rd corps of the Imperial Iranian Army. He was named as a military adviser to the Shah Mohammad Reza Pahlavi in September 1953. Hejazi was promoted to the rank of lieutenant general in 1958 and then to the rank of full general. Hejazi also served as the ambassador of Pahlavi Iran to Pakistan. In 1969 he committed suicide.

References

External links

1904 births
1969 suicides
Ambassadors of Iran to Pakistan
Commanders of Imperial Iranian Armed Forces
École Spéciale Militaire de Saint-Cyr alumni
Imperial Iranian Armed Forces four-star generals
Suicides in Iran
People of Pahlavi Iran
Iranian prisoners and detainees
20th-century Iranian diplomats